Nancarrow (or Nancherrow) is a Cornish surname meaning the "valley of the deer". Notable people with the surname include:

 Alexandra Nancarrow (born 1993), Australian tennis player
 Cam Nancarrow (born 1945), Australian squash player
 Conlon Nancarrow (1912–1997), American-Mexican composer
 John Nancarrow; see Last speaker of the Cornish language
 Tristan Nancarrow (born 1964), Australian squash player

Cornish-language surnames